Strode College is a tertiary institution and a further education college situated in Street, Somerset, England offering Sixth Form education as well as Higher Education courses. In October 2022, the college was rated as "Good" by Ofsted and in June 2017, was awarded a Silver Award by the Teaching Excellence Framework.

Performance
In 2019, 30% of A Level entries achieved high grades A* and A; 62% achieved grades A* to B and 87% achieved grades A* to C. 91% of A Level subjects achieved 100% pass rate. Similarly, 85% of Strode’s vocational students achieved at least their target grades. In many cases this was far exceeded, for example 95% of Engineering students and 91% of Business students achieved high grades, equivalent to an A* - B in A Levels.

Facilities
Over £20 million has been invested in college facilities over the past ten years. The most recent project completed in August 2011 was to extend the college sports hall to provide a specialist dance and exercise studio. Strode Theatre is on the college campus and provides rehearsal and drama space for students from the college.

References

Further education colleges in Somerset
Learning and Skills Beacons
Street, Somerset